The following lists events that happened during 1934 in South Africa.

Incumbents
 Monarch: King George V
 Governor-General: The Earl of Clarendon
 Prime Minister: James Barry Munnik Hertzog
 Chief Justice: John Wessels

Events
February
 1 – South African Airways is inaugurated and takes over the passenger and goods air services from Union Airways.

June
 The National Party and South African Party unite to form the United Party. 

July
 9 – The Hitler Youth movement is prohibited in South West Africa.

December
 3 – The Status of the Union Act and the Royal Executive Functions and Seals Act come into operation: i.a. they make Parliament the sovereign legislative power in the Union;  adopt parts of the Statute of Westminster;  vest the executive government in the king, acting on the advice of the South African ministers only;  and institute the Royal Great Seal of the Union and the Royal Signet of the Union. 

Unknown date
 The Slums Act is passed, giving municipalities and the government the authority to acquire slum properties.

Births
 5 January – Phil Ramone, recording engineer, record producer, violinist and composer, co-founder of A & R Recording, Inc. (d. 2013)
 14 January – Laurie Ackermann, Constitutional Court of South Africa judge
 8 May – Sibusiso Bengu, politician
 16 May – Ronnie Govender, playwright and director (d, 2021)
 26 May – Dullah Omar, lawyer and politician. (d. 2004)
 28 June – Peter Beighton, English-born geneticist (d. 2017)
 5 August – Zakes Mokae, actor (d. 2009)
 8 August – Sam Nzima, photographer who took what became the well known image of Hector Pieterson for the Soweto uprising (d. 2018)
 3 October – Harold Henning, golfer. (d. 2004)
 8 October – Kader Asmal, activist, politician and professor of human rights (d. 2011)
 9 October – Abdullah Ibrahim, pianist and composer
 20 October – Mary Peach, film and television actress
 8 November – Edward Bhengu, activist and founding member of the Pan Africanist Congress of Azania (d. 2010)
 9 November – Ronald Harwood, playwright (d. 2020)

Deaths
 27 March – Francis William Reitz, president of the Orange Free State. (b. 1844)
 28 July – Louis Tancred, cricketer. (b. 1876)

Railways

Railway lines opened
 26 February – Transvaal – Northam to Thabazimbi, .
 29 July – Transvaal – Germiston to Elsburg, .
 21 September – Transvaal – Tuinplaas to Marble Hall, .
 15 October – Cape – Kleinstraat to Matroosberg, .

References

History of South Africa